Sagi Genis (born 10 January 2004) is an Israeli footballer who currently plays as a forward for Hapoel Tel Aviv.

Career statistics

Club

References

2004 births
Living people
Israeli footballers
Israel youth international footballers
Association football forwards
Hapoel Tel Aviv F.C. players
Israeli Premier League players
Footballers from Southern District (Israel)